Shinki may refer to:

 Busou Shinki, a product line of small, armored women action-figure toys manufactured in Japan
 Venancio Shinki (1932–2016), Peruvian painter
 Shinki Bus